James Meadows may refer to:

James Joseph Meadows (1835–1914), Protestant Christian missionary to China
Jimmy Meadows (1931–1994), English footballer and manager
James S. Meadows, Lord Mayor of Birmingham, England for the year 1966–1967
James Meadows (rugby league) (born 1999), rugby league footballer
James Meadows (pioneer) (1817–1937), English-born pioneer that settled in Carmel Valley, California

See also
James Meadows Rendel (disambiguation)